Zachariah Mar Athanasios (born Cherian Polachirackal; 19 February 1909 in Tiruvalla, India – 29 September 1977 in Tiruvalla), was a Saint Thomas Christian Syro-Malankara Catholic Bishop of Tiruvalla. Athanasios was born into a Jacobite Orthodox family on 19 February 1909 in Tiruvalla. He later converted to Catholicism. Athanasios was ordained a priest on 24 August 1946. On 31 December 1953 he was appointed Auxiliary Bishop. His consecration took place on 22 April 1954. On 27 January 1955, after the death of his predecessor, Joseph Mar Severios, he was appointed Bishop. He died on 29 September 1977.

References

External links
 

Converts to Eastern Catholicism from Oriental Orthodoxy
Syro-Malankara bishops
1909 births
1977 deaths
People from Thiruvalla